Moin Uddin Bhuiyan is a Bangladeshi Jatiya Party (Ershad) politician and the former Member of Parliament of Narsingdi-5.

Career
Bhuiyan was elected to parliament from Narsingdi-5 as a Jatiya Party candidate in 1988.

References

Jatiya Party politicians
Living people
4th Jatiya Sangsad members
Year of birth missing (living people)